{{DISPLAYTITLE:C43H66O14}}
The molecular formula C43H66O14 (molar mass: 806.98 g/mol, exact mass: 806.4453 u) may refer to:

 Acetyldigitoxin
 Gymnemic acid

Molecular formulas